A span loop is a non-jamming loop that can be tied away from the ends of the rope.

Information
The span loop is known for being extremely easy to untie. The beginning of tying this knot begins with tying a Half Sheepshank, which is also known as a Bell Ringer's Knot. In order to tie this, the same one-handed twist method employed for tying a bowline can be used. One bight or loop will poke up through the half-hitch, and it will perfectly match the end of the rope that is also poking up through the signature half-hitch part of a bowline as it is done with the one hand twist method. The next thing to do is to push the bottom loop back up and through the top loop.

References

External links
Span Loop

Loop knots